White Pine Camp is an Adirondack Great Camp on Osgood Pond in Paul Smiths, New York.  It served as the Summer White House for US President Calvin Coolidge from July 7 through September 18, 1926.

The camp was designed by architects William Massarene and Addison Mizner and built by Ben Muncil.

The camp was later owned by Adele Levy and Edith Stern, daughters of Julius Rosenwald, the chairman of Sears-Roebuck; they donated it to Paul Smiths College, which used it for student housing for the next 35 years. The current owners operate the camp as a museum and guest cottage.

See also
 List of residences of presidents of the United States

References

External links
Adirondack Architectural Heritage - White Pine Camp
Time, "At White Pine Camp", August 30, 1926

Adirondack Great Camps
Museums in Franklin County, New York
History museums in New York (state)
Addison Mizner buildings
Buildings and structures in Franklin County, New York
Paul Smiths, New York